Carinoturris adrastia is a species of sea snail, a marine gastropod mollusk in the family Pseudomelatomidae, the turrids and allies.

Description
The length of the decollate holotype attains 16 cm, its diameter 6.25 mm.

(Original description) The white shell has a thin, pale olive periostracum.  The apex is invariably eroded, and the subsequent whorls, eight or more, are polished and faintly showing incremental lines. The suture is inconspicuous, the anterior margin is sometimes raised like a small cord. The spiral sculpture consists of a strong, sometimes nodulous or undulated peripheral keel, rather nearer the succeeding suture than to the preceding one, the latter space occupied by the slightly concave anal fasciole. The axial sculpture consists only of arcuate incremental lines. The base of the shell is rounded;.
The aperture is narrow. The outer lip is thin, sharp, produced and internally smooth. The anal sulcus is wide and shallow, with no parietal nodule. The inner lip is erased. The columella is smooth, twisted, not pervious, attenuated obliquely toward the rather long, slightly recurved siphonal canal.

Distribution
The holotype of this marine species was found off Monterey Bay, California, USA.

References

External links
 
 Worldwide Mollusc Species Data Base: Pseudomelatomidae

adrastia
Gastropods described in 1919